Mitchel Arthur Wongsodikromo (born 26 August 1985) is a Surinamese badminton player and coach. He competed for Suriname at three Pan Am Games: 2003 Pan American Games, 2007 Pan American Games & the 2011 Pan American Games. As a very young badminton player of the club T.N.F. (Tan Na Fesi) in Suriname Mitchel Wongsodikromo was an exceptional talent and won numerous juniors titles and was soon selected to represent his country abroad winning several juniors medals at Caribbean, Central American and South American events. Much of his success was with his doubles partner Virgil Soeroredjo.

Multiple Caribbean and Pan Am Juniors Badminton Champion
Together they grew up to become a badminton force for Suriname in the Pan Am region. Already in 1997 Mitchel Wongsodikromo participated in the Surinamese U-19 juniors team event winning a Silver medal in Barbados. Also in 1997 Mitchel Wongsodikromo became South American Boys Singles U-13 Champion and Boys Doubles U-15 Champion in São Paulo, Brazil also winning a Silver medal in Mixed Doubles U-17. In 1999 Mitchel Wongsodikromo took Gold in the Mixed Doubles U-19 and the Team Event U-19, but also Silver in the Boys Singles & Boys Doubles U-19 categories at the Carebaco Games held in Suriname.

The year 2000 was a top year for the badminton athlete, he participated at the IBF World Academy training camp held in Cape Town, South Africa. In 2000 Mitchel Wongsodikromo won a Gold medal in the Boys Singles U-15 category at the South American Juniors Championships in Argentina. At that event Mitchel also won a Silver medal in the Boys Doubles U-15 category. In the same year 2000 he and Virgil Soeroredjo won the Pan American Boys Doubles U-17 juniors title at Cuba after they had already won the Caribbean Boys Doubles titles U-17 and U-19 the same year at Barbados. At the 2000 Carebaco Games Mitchel Wongsodikromo won five Gold Medals. Winning the triple in the U-19 category plus Boys Doubles in the U-17 category and the U-19 team event for Suriname.

In 2001 Mitchel Wongsodikromo managed to successfully defend four of his five Carebaco juniors titles only losing his singles U-19 title at Jamaica. In 2001 Virgil and Mitchel won Boys Doubles U-17 Gold at the South American Juniors Championships in Rio de Janeiro, Brazil. Mitchel also took Bronze at the Boys Singles U-17 event and Bronze at the Mixed Doubles U-19 event. That year they also won the Regatas Cup for Boys Doubles U-17 in Lima, Peru. Mitchel again also took two Bronze medals in Peru at the Boys Singles U-17 and Mixed Doubles U-17.

In 2002 Mitchel Wongsodikromo and Virgil Soeroredjo became Pan American Juniors Semi-Champions U-19 in Orange County, USA. At the same event Mitchel Wongsodikromo also took a Bronze Medal in the U-19 Mixed team event, where the Surinamese juniors team surprisingly beat favorites Canada ending on a third place behind USA and Peru, but higher than fourth place Canada and fifth place Brazil. In the 2002 Carebaco Games Mitchel Wongsodikromo won Gold at Men's Doubles U-19 and Silver at the Men's Singles juniors categories at Puerto Rico. In the 2003 Carebaco Games at Trinidad & Tobago Virgil Soeroredjo lost both the U-19 Boys Singles & Mixed Doubles finals to his compatriot Mitchel Wongsodikromo, who took four Gold medals that event. Together they eventually won the Boys Doubles U-19 title and the Carebaco Juniors 2003 team event.

International & National Achievements
In 2002 they both won a Men's Singles Bronze medal at the 2002 Central American and Caribbean Games (CACSO Games 2002) in San Salvador. At that time a special achievement since they were both still only 17-year-old juniors. In 2005 at the Carebaco Open Championships Mitchel was part of the Surinamese team achieving a Bronze Medal in the Caribbean Team Event held in Cuba.

Mitchel Wongsodikromo gained five National Men's Singles titles in 2003, 2005, 2009, 2010 and 2012. Internationally he was a three times Men's Doubles champion at the Suriname International Badminton Tournament in 2008, 2009 and 2011. He also won the Mixed Doubles title two times at the Suriname International in 2009 and in 2012. 
In 2010 Mitchel Wongsodikromo & Virgil Soeroredjo reached the final at the Bill Graham Miami International and in 2011 they reached the semi-final of that same event. In 2011 Mitchel Wongsodikromo won both the Suriname International and the Carebaco International in Men's Doubles. In March 2010 Mitchel Wongsodikromo was also part of the Suriname badminton team that won a Bronze medal Mixed Teams Badminton at the 2010 South American Games in Medellín. Together with his compatriot Crystal Leefmans another Bronze medal was won by Mitchel Wongsodikromo in the individual Mixed Doubles event. In July 2010 Mitchel Wongsodikromo and Virgil Soeroredjo won the only medal, a Bronze, for Suriname at the 2010 Central American and Caribbean Games by reaching the semi-finales. In 2012 Mitchel Wongsodikromo was part of the first Suriname Men's badminton team that participated at the Thomas Cup preliminaries in Los Angeles, USA.

National Badminton Titles

2019 – National Championships : Men's Doubles Gold & Mixed Doubles Silver
2018 – National Championships : Mitchel Wongsodikromo did not participate that year
2017 – National Championships : Men's Doubles Silver
2016 – National Championships : Mixed Doubles Gold
2014 – National Championships : Mixed Doubles Gold
2013 – National Championships : Mitchel Wongsodikromo did not participate that year
2012 – National Championships : Men's Singles Gold, Men's Doubles Gold & Mixed Doubles Gold
2011 – National Championships : Men's Singles Silver, & Men's Doubles Gold 
2010 – National Championships : Men's Singles Gold, Men's Doubles Gold & Mixed Doubles Silver
2009 – National Championships : Men's Singles Gold, Men's Doubles Gold & Mixed Doubles Gold
2008 – National Championships : Men's Singles Silver, Men's Doubles Gold & Mixed Doubles Gold
2007 – National Championships : No National Championships held that year 
2006 – National Championships : Men's Singles Silver, Men's Doubles Gold & Mixed Doubles Silver
2005 – National Championships : Men's Singles Gold, & Mixed Doubles Gold
2004 – National Championships : Men's Singles Silver &, Men's Doubles Gold & Mixed Doubles Gold
2003 – National Championships : Men's Singles Gold, Men's Doubles Gold & Mixed Doubles Gold
2002 – National Championships : No National Championships held that year
2001 – National Championships : Mixed Doubles Silver
2000 – National Championships : Men's Doubles Gold
1999 – National Championships : Men's Doubles Silver
1997 – Surinamese National Junior Badminton Championships : Boys' Singles & Boys' Doubles U-13, U-15, U-17 Gold & Mixed Doubles U-15 Gold
1996 – Surinamese National Junior Badminton Championships : Boys' Singles, Boys' Doubles & Mixed Doubles U-12 & U-14 Gold 
1995 – Surinamese National Junior Badminton Championships : Boys' Singles, Boys' Doubles & Mixed Doubles U-12 & U-14 Gold 
1994 – Surinamese National Junior Badminton Championships : Boys' Singles, Boys' Doubles & Mixed Doubles U-12  Gold & Boys' Singles U-14 Gold
1993 – Surinamese National Junior Badminton Championships : Boys' Singles & Boys' Doubles U-12 Gold

Surinamese National Badminton Circuit Titles A Class

2018 – 12e Boijmans Memorial Toernooi 2018: Men's Doubles Silver
2017 – 30ste Ma Lefi Toernooi 2017: Men's Doubles Gold & Mixed Doubles Silver
2017 – Lilian Bendter Toernooi 2017: Men's Doubles Gold & Mixed Doubles Gold
2015 – 3e KNTS Nieuwjaars-Badmintontoernooi 2015: Mixed Doubles Gold
2015 – 9e Gerard Boijmans Memorial Badminton Toernooi 2015: Men's Singles Gold
2015 – 19e Ro Caster Memorial Badminton Toernooi 2015: Men's Doubles Gold 
2015 – 28e Ma Lefi Badminton Toernooi 2015: Men's Singles Gold & Mixed Doubles Silver 
2014 – 8e Gerard Boijmans Memorial Badminton Toernooi 2015: Men's Singles Gold
2014 – 3rd Assuria International Easter Badminton Tournament 2014: Men's Singles Bronze
2013 – 7e Gerard Boijmans Memorial Badminton Toernooi 2015: Men's Singles Gold
2013 – 2e Nieuw Stenov Badminton Paastoernooi 2013: Mixed Doubles Gold
2013 – 26e Ma Lefi Badmintontoernooi 2013: Men's Singles Gold & Mixed Doubles Gold
2013 – 2e Top 8 Masters Badminton Invitatie Toernooi 2013: Men's Singles Gold
2013 – Lilian Bendter Memorial 2013 toernooi: Men's Doubles Silver

International Badminton Titles

1997 – Carebaco Juniors Championships : Team Event U-19 Silver
1997 – South American Juniors Championships : Boys Singles U-13 Gold, Boys Doubles U-15 Gold, Mixed Doubles U-19 Gold
1998 – Caribbean Easter Tournament Curaçao : Boys Doubles U-19 Silver
1998 – Carebaco Juniors Championships : Team Event U-19 Bronze
1999 – Caribbean Easter Tournament Curaçao : Boys Singles U-15 Gold, Boys Doubles U-15 Gold, Boys Doubles U-19 Bronze &  Mixed Doubles U-15 Gold
1999 – Carebaco Juniors Championships : Boys Single U-19 Silver, Boys Doubles U-19 Silver, Mixed Doubles U-19 Gold, Team Event U-19 Gold
2000 – South American Juniors Championships : Boys Singles U-15 Gold & Boys Doubles U-15 Silver
2000 – Carebaco Juniors Championships : Boys Singles U-19 Gold, Boys Doubles U-17 & U-19 Gold & Mixed Doubles U-19 Gold & Team Event U-19 Gold
2000 – Pan Am Juniors Championships   : Boys Singles U-17 Silver & Boys Doubles U-17 Gold
2001 – Regatas Peru Juniors Open      : Boys Singles U-17 Bronze, Boys Doubles U-17 Gold, Mixed Doubles U-17 Bronze
2001 – Carebaco Juniors Championships : Boys Doubles U-17 & U-19 Gold, Mixed Doubles U-19 Gold & Team Event U-19 Gold
2001 – South American Juniors Championships : Boys Singles U-17 Bronze, Boys Doubles U-19 Gold, Mixed Doubles U-19 Gold
2002 – Pan Am Juniors Championships   : Boys Doubles U-19 Silver & Team Event U-19 Bronze
2002 – Carebaco Juniors Championships : Boys Singles U-19 Silver & Boys Doubles U-19 Gold
2002 – CACSO Games El Salvador        : Men's Singles Bronze Medal
2002 – Kembit Youth International Hoensbroek – Limburg, NL : Mixed Doubles U-19 Bronze
2003 – Carebaco Juniors Championships : Boys Singles U-19 Gold, Boys Doubles U-19 Gold, Mixed Doubles U-19 Gold, Team Event U-19 Gold, Team Event Seniors Bronze
2003 – 2003 PAN AM Games Santo Domingo: Participation
2005 – Carebaco Open Championships    : Team Event Bronze
2006 – BC70 Veluwe Open Tournament Vaassen, NL: Men's Doubles Gold
2006 – BC Weesp Tournament, NL        : Men's Doubles Gold
2007 – Carebaco Open Championships    : Men's Doubles Bronze
2007 – 2007 PAN AM Games Rio de Janeiro: Participation
2008 – 2nd Suriname International     : Men's Singles Silver, Men's Doubles Gold & Mixed Doubles Silver
2009 – 3rd Suriname International     : Men's Doubles Gold & Mixed Doubles Gold
2010 – CACSO Games Mayagüez           : Men's Doubles Bronze Medal
2010 – SOUTH AMERICAN Games Medellín  : Mixed Doubles Bronze & Team Event Bronze
2010 – Bill Graham Miami International: Men's Doubles Silver
2010 – 4th Suriname International     : Men's Doubles Silver & Mixed Doubles Silver
2011 – Cuba Giraldilla International  : Men's Singles Bronze
2011 – Carebaco Open Championships    : Men's Doubles Gold & Mixed Doubles Gold
2011 – 2011 PAN AM Games Guadelajara  : Participation
2011 – Bill Graham Miami International: Men's Doubles Bronze
2011 – 5th Suriname International     : Men's Doubles Gold
2012 – Thomas Cup Pan Am preliminaries: 1st Participation Surinamese Men's Team
2012 – Trilan Tournament Landgraaf, NL: Men's Singles Silver & Men's Doubles Bronze
2012 – Carebaco Open Championships    : Men's Singles Bronze, Mixed Doubles Silver & Team Event Silver
2012 – Bill Graham Miami International: Men's Doubles Bronze & Mixed Doubles Silver 
2012 – 6th Suriname International     : Mixed Doubles Gold
2013 – 7th Suriname International     : Silver 
2014 – 8th Suriname International     : Men's Doubles Silver  
2015 – Jamaica International     : Men's Doubles Bronze 
2016 – 10th Suriname International     : Men's Doubles Silver 
2016 – 10th Suriname International     : Mixed Doubles Bronze 
2017 – 11th Suriname International     : Men's Doubles Bronze 
2018 – Carebaco Open Championships     : Men's Doubles Bronze 
2018 – 12th Suriname International     : Mixed Doubles Silver 
2019 – 13th Suriname International     : Men's Doubles Gold

Achievements with results

Central American and Caribbean Games 
Men's singles

Men's doubles

South American Games  
Mixed doubles

BWF International Series/ Future Series (8 titles, 12 runner-up) 
Men's singles

Men's doubles

Mixed doubles

 BWF International Challenge tournament
 BWF International Series tournament
 BWF Future Series tournament

References

1985 births
Living people
Sportspeople from Paramaribo
Surinamese people of Javanese descent
Surinamese male badminton players
Badminton players at the 2003 Pan American Games
Badminton players at the 2007 Pan American Games
Badminton players at the 2011 Pan American Games
Pan American Games competitors for Suriname
Competitors at the 2002 Central American and Caribbean Games
Competitors at the 2006 Central American and Caribbean Games
Competitors at the 2010 Central American and Caribbean Games
Central American and Caribbean Games bronze medalists for Suriname
South American Games bronze medalists for Suriname
South American Games medalists in badminton
Competitors at the 2010 South American Games
Central American and Caribbean Games medalists in badminton